José Luis Capón González (6 February 1948 – 29 March 2020) was a Spanish footballer from Madrid.

He played for Atlético Madrid between 1970 and 1980, winning the Spanish League in 1973 and 1977, the Spanish Cup in 1976, and the Intercontinental Cup in 1974. He played in the 1974 European Cup Final, which Atlético lost.

He died on 29 March 2020 at the age of 72 from pneumonia resulting from COVID-19.

International goals

Honours
Atlético Madrid
Intercontinental Cup: 1974
Spanish League: 1972–73, 1976–77
Spanish Cup: 1975–76

References

External links
 
 National team data 
 
 

1948 births
2020 deaths
Footballers from Madrid
Spanish footballers
Association football defenders
La Liga players
Atlético Madrid footballers
Burgos CF (1936) footballers
Elche CF players
Deaths from the COVID-19 pandemic in Spain
Spain under-23 international footballers
Spain amateur international footballers
Spain international footballers